Arnold Abner Newman (March 3, 1918 – June 6, 2006) was an American photographer, noted for his "environmental portraits" of artists and politicians. He was also known for his carefully composed abstract still life images.

Early life and career
Born in Manhattan, Newman grew up in Atlantic City, New Jersey and later moved to Miami Beach, Florida. In 1936, he studied painting and drawing at the University of Miami. Unable to afford to continue after two years, he moved to Philadelphia to work for a studio, making 49-cent portraits in 1938.

Newman returned to Florida in 1942 to manage a portrait studio in West Palm Beach. Three years later, he opened his own business in Miami Beach.

In 1946, Newman relocated to New York, opened Arnold Newman Studios and worked as a freelance photographer for Fortune, Life, and Newsweek. Though never a member, Newman frequented the Photo League during the 1940s.

Success as a photographer
Newman found his vision in the empathy he felt for artists and their work. Although he photographed many personalities—Marlene Dietrich, John F. Kennedy, Harry S. Truman, Piet Mondrian, Pablo Picasso, Arthur Miller, Marilyn Monroe, Ronald Reagan, Mickey Mantle, and  Audrey Hepburn—he maintained that even if the subject is not known, or is already forgotten, the photograph itself must still excite and interest the viewer.

Newman is often credited with being the photographer who articulated and who consistently employed the genre of environmental portraiture, in which the photographer uses a carefully framed and lit setting, and its contents, to symbolise the individual's life and work; a well known example being his portrait of Igor Stravinsky in which the lid of his grand piano forms a gargantuan musical note representative of the melodic structure of the composer's work. Newman normally captured his subjects in their most familiar surroundings with representative visual elements showing their professions and personalities. A musician for instance might be photographed in their recording studio or on stage, a Senator or other politician in their office or a representative building. Using a large-format camera and tripod, he worked to record every detail of a scene.

"I didn't just want to make a photograph with some things in the background," Newman told American Photo magazine in an interview. "The surroundings had to add to the composition and the understanding of the person. No matter who the subject was, it had to be an interesting photograph. Just to simply do a portrait of a famous person doesn't mean a thing."

Newman's best-known images were in black and white, although he often photographed in color. His 1946 black and white portrait of Stravinsky seated at a grand piano became his signature image, even though it was rejected by Harper's Bazaar, the magazine that gave the assignment to Newman. He was one of the few photographers allowed to make a portrait of the famously camera-shy Henri Cartier-Bresson.

Among Newman's best-known color images is an eerie portrait from 1963 that shows former Nazi industrialist and minister of armament Alfried Krupp in one of Krupp's factories. Newman admits his personal feelings influenced his portrayal of Krupp.

Newman taught photography at Cooper Union for many years.

On December 19, 2005, Newman made his last formal portrait of director James (Jimmy) Burrows at the NBC studio on the Saturday Night Live stage. This session was particularly special for Newman because he had photographed Jimmy's father Abe Burrows several times. He was recovering from a stroke when he died at Mt. Sinai Medical Center, New York on June 6, 2006.

Bibliography

Awards
1985 Missouri Honor Medal for Distinguished Service in Journalism, Missouri School of Journalism, University of Missouri, Columbia, MO
1999 Infinity Award for Master of Photography, International Center of Photography, Manhattan
2004 Lucie Award for Outstanding Achievement in Portrait Photography, International Photography Awards program, Los Angeles, California
 2004 He was awarded The Royal Photographic Society's Centenary Medal and Honorary Fellowship (HonFRPS) in recognition of a sustained, significant contribution to the art of photography.
 2006 Newman was inducted into the International Photography Hall of Fame and Museum

References 

1918 births
2006 deaths
Modern artists
People from Miami Beach, Florida
Photographers from New York City
Photographers from Philadelphia
People from West Palm Beach, Florida
American portrait photographers
University of Miami alumni